Tapinanthus preussii is a species of plant in the family Loranthaceae. It is found in Angola, Cameroon, Gabon, and Nigeria. Its natural habitat is subtropical or tropical moist lowland forests. It is threatened by habitat loss.

References

preussii
Vulnerable plants
Taxonomy articles created by Polbot